Kerdyom (Küördem) is a rural locality (a selo) and the administrative center of Zhemkonsky 2-y Rural Okrug of Khangalassky District in the Sakha Republic, Russia, located  from Pokrovsk, the administrative center of the district. Its population as of the 2010 Census was 1,015; up from 867 recorded in the 2002 Census.

Geography
Kerdyom is located by the mouth of the Lyutenge on the right bank of the Lena River.

References

Notes

Sources
Official website of the Sakha Republic. Registry of the Administrative-Territorial Divisions of the Sakha Republic. Khangalassky District. 

Rural localities in Khangalassky District